Canal+ Calédonie, originally called Canal Satellite Nouvelle-Calédonie and CanalSat Calédonie, is a satellite provider based in the Overseas French Department of New Caledonia and Wallis and Futuna, and with reduced offers in Vanuatu. It was launched in 1999 to distribute satellite television to the region. It offered 48 C=channels, four radio stations and eight international channels. It broadcasts using the Intelsat 701 Satellite at 180 degrees east.

Channels

Canal+ 
 Canal+ Calédonie
 Canal+ Cinéma
 Canal+ Sport
 Canal+ Family

France Télévisions
 Nouvelle-Calédonie 1ère
 Wallis et Futuna 1ère
 France 2
 France 3
 France 4
 France 5

General entertainment
 TF1
 M6
 TV5 Monde
Arte
TMC
TFX
TF1 Séries Films

Cinéma
 Canal+ Cinéma
 Ciné + Premier
 Ciné + Star
 Action
 Ciné + Frisson
 Ciné + Émotion
 Canal+ Family
 Ciné + Famiz
 Ciné + Club
 Ciné + Classic
 Canal Hollywood
TCM Cinéma
Disney Cinema

Adult
 XXL

Sport
 Canal+ Sport
 Eurosport 1
 Eurosport 2
 L'Équipe TV
 Motorsport.tv
 Infosport+

Children
Disney Junior
 TiJi
 Gulli
Canal J
Télétoon+
Télétoon+1
Piwi+
Nickelodeon

Entertainment
 RTL9
 TF6
 Téva
 Planète Adventure & Experience
 Sci Fi
Comédie+
W9
C8
6ter
RMC Story
Chérie 25

Music
 MCM Top
 MCM Pop
 Mezzo TV
 Trace Urban
RFM TV
MTV Hits
MTV Hits (HD)
M6 Music
NRJ Hits
CStar
CStar Hits France

Documentaries
 Planète
 Planète Thalassa
 National Geographic
 Voyage
Seasons
Histoire

News
 LCI
 EuroNews

International
Canal+ Premium
MiniMini+
TeleToon+
Canal+ Sport
Canal+ Family
Novelas+
Planete+
Ale Kino+

Radio stations
 Europe 1
 France Info
 Fréquence Jazz
 RFM

See also
 Canal+ Group
 Canal+ (French TV provider)
 Canal+ Afrique
 Canal+ Caraïbes

References

External links
Official Site

Canal+
Direct broadcast satellite services
Television in France
Mass media in New Caledonia